The Group of Eastern European States (EEG) is one of the five United Nations regional groups and is composed of 23 Member States from Eastern, Central and Southern Europe.

The Group, as with all the regional groups, is a non-binding dialogue group where subjects concerning regional and international matters are discussed. Additionally, the Group works to help allocate seats on United Nations bodies by nominating candidates from the region.

History 

Prior to the creation of the Regional Groups in 1964, the United Nations Security Council had an Eastern European and Asian Seat, that was occupied between 1946 and 1964 by countries from Eastern Europe (including Greece and Turkey), as well as by members of the modern Western European and Others and Asia-Pacific Groups.

Since its creation, the Group has changed significantly due to the dissolution of various members: the Soviet Union in 1991, Yugoslavia between 1991-2006 and Czechoslovakia in 1993. Additionally, through the process of German reunification, the Group lost the German Democratic Republic as one of its member states.

Members

Current members 
The following are the current Member States of the Eastern European Group:

Historical members 
 (1966–1993)
 (1966–1992)
 (1973–1990)
 (1992–2006)

Representation
The Eastern European Group has two seats in the United Nations Security Council (UNSC); the permanent seat of Russia, and one elected seat, currently held by Albania. The Group further has 6 seats on the United Nations Economic and Social Council and 6 seats on the United Nations Human Rights Council. It is also eligible for having its nationals elected as President of the United Nations General Assembly in years ending with 2 and 7; most recently, Miroslav Lajčák of Slovakia was elected to this position in 2017 and was the office holder of the Sixty-seventh session.

Security Council 
The Eastern European Group holds two seats on the Security Council, 1 non-permanent and 1 permanent. The current members of the Security Council from the Group are:

Economic and Social Council 
The Eastern European Group holds six seats on the United Nations Economic and Social Council. The current members of the Economic and Social Council from the Group are:

Human Rights Council 
The Eastern European Group holds six seats on the United Nations Human Rights Council. The current members of the Economic and Social Council from the Group are:

Presidency of the General Assembly 

Every five years in the years ending in 2 and 7, the Eastern European Group is eligible to elect a president to the General Assembly.

The following is a list of presidents from the region since its official creation in 1963:

Timeline of membership 
As the Eastern European Group changed significantly over time, the number of its members had also changed.

See also
 Community for Democracy and Rights of Nations
 Community of Democratic Choice
 Council of Europe
 Eastern Europe
 Eastern Partnership
 Eurasian Union
 Euronest Parliamentary Assembly
 European Neighborhood Policy
 Eurovoc
 Future enlargement of the European Union
 List of political parties in Eastern Europe
 Organization for Security and Co-operation in Europe
 Post-Soviet states

References

United Nations coalitions and unofficial groups